Outside Love is the third album by Pink Mountaintops, released by Jagjaguwar in 2009 and produced by John Congleton. Many critics listed it on The Georgia Straight'''s 'Top Ten Albums of 2009'.

ReceptionOutside Love received positive reviews from critics. On Metacritic, the album holds a score of 75 out of 100 based on 21 reviews, indicating "generally favorable reviews."

 Track listing 

Additional Information
 The song 'While We Were Dreaming' was used in the 2010 film Charlie St. Cloud''.

References

2009 albums
Pink Mountaintops albums
Jagjaguwar albums
Albums produced by John Congleton